A constitutional referendum was held in Turkey on 7 November 1982. The new constitution was approved by 91.4% of voters, with a 91.3% turnout.

Background
In 1980 the Grand National Assembly was scheduled to elect a new President to replace Fahri Korutürk. However, the parties were unable to agree on a candidate, and on 12 September 1980, the Turkish Armed Forces led by Kenan Evren staged a coup d'état, dissolved the Grand National Assembly and started ruling the country through the National Security Council.

The NSC set up a Consultative Assembly and appointed all 160 members. Political parties were shut down, and those who had been members of parties were excluded from the Assembly. It worked from 23 November 1981 and 17 July 1982 to draw up the new constitution, which would replace the 1961 document.

New constitution
One of the transitional provisions of the constitution named Evren as President until 1989. The constitution also banned civil society organisations from political activity, whilst political parties were banned from working with civil society organisations, including trade unions. The Army was given a majority in the National Security Council, which was also deemed to be superior to the cabinet.

Evren claimed the new constitution had liberties "luxurious" for Turkey.

Results

References

1982
1982 referendums
1982 in Turkey